Mimorsidis yayeyamensis is a species of beetle in the family Cerambycidae. It was described by Breuning and Villiers in 1973.

References

Lamiini
Beetles described in 1973